The 7th Politburo of the Lao People's Revolutionary Party (LPRP), officially the Political Bureau of the 7th Central Committee of the Lao People's Revolutionary Party, was elected in 2001 by the 1st Plenary Session of the 7th Central Committee, in the immediate aftermath of the 7th National Congress.

Members

References

Specific

Bibliography
Books:
 

7th Politburo of the Lao People's Revolutionary Party
2001 establishments in Laos
2006 disestablishments in Laos